Fatih Ağduman (born 26 February 1982) is a Turkish curler and curling coach.

He has been a National Coach of the Turkish Curling Federation since 2015.

Record as a coach of national teams

References

External links

 
 
 Fatih AĞDUMAN - Atatürk University
 Asst. Prof. Fatih AĞDUMAN | AVESİS
 Fatih AĞDUMAN - Google Akademik
 Fatih Agduman | Publons
 Fatih AĞDUMAN - Profil » DergiPark
 Video: 

Living people
1982 births
Turkish male curlers
Turkish curling coaches
Place of birth missing (living people)
21st-century Turkish people